York Island is one of the Apostle Islands in northern Wisconsin, in Lake Superior, and is part of the Apostle Islands National Lakeshore. It is located in the Town of Russell in Bayfield County.

Notes

Apostle Islands
Protected areas of Bayfield County, Wisconsin
Landforms of Bayfield County, Wisconsin